The following highways are numbered 872:

United States